Frederick Harris Rowe (November 10, 1923 – September 8, 2013) was an American politician, businessman, and lawyer.

Born in Jacksonville, Illinois, Rowe graduated from Jacksonville High School and then served in the United States Army Air Forces during World War II. He received his bachelor's degree from Illinois College and his law degree from Northwestern University School of Law. He then practiced law in Jacksonville, Illinois, and also worked in his family's insurance business. Rowe also was in the banking business. Rowe served on the Jacksonville City Council and was a Republican. Then, Rowe served in the Illinois House of Representatives from 1961 to 1967. He was the Republican candidate for Illinois state treasurer in 1966, narrowly losing to Adlai Stevenson III by 39,655 votes out of 3.7 million votes cast.  His father was Richard Yates Rowe who served as Illinois state treasurer and Illinois secretary of state and who unsuccessfully sought the Republican nomination for governor in 1952. Rowe died in Jacksonville, Illinois, at the age of 89.

Notes

1923 births
2013 deaths
Politicians from Jacksonville, Illinois
Military personnel from Illinois
United States Army Air Forces personnel of World War II
Illinois College alumni
Northwestern University Pritzker School of Law alumni
Businesspeople from Illinois
Illinois lawyers
Illinois city council members
Republican Party members of the Illinois House of Representatives
20th-century American businesspeople
20th-century American lawyers